Johann Christian Heinrich Rinck (18 February 1770 – 23 July 1846) was a German composer and organist of the late classical and early romantic eras.

Life and career
Rinck was born in Elgersburg (in present-day Thuringia), and died in Darmstadt, aged 76.

He studied with Johann Christian Kittel (1732–1809), (a pupil of Johann Sebastian Bach), and eventually became Kantor at the music school in Darmstadt, where he was also a court organist from 1813. He composed prolifically, and an organ primer of his enjoyed wide popularity.

Among his works is a set of Variations on ‘Ah! vous dirai-je, Maman’, Opus 90, published by Simrock in 1828.  It is based on a tune made familiar by Mozart (K. 265) (and generally associated with the words Twinkle Twinkle Little Star).

Notable students include composer Georg Vierling and Benedict Jucker (1811-1876).

Works

Piano works
 XXX zweistimmige Übungen durch alle Tonarten (30 Exercices à deux parties dans tous les tons) op. 67. Verlag Dohr
 Neuausgabe der Klaviervariationen, krit. rev. Neuausgabe. 
Heft 1: Freut euch des Lebens op. 39;  Das Vögelchen op. 61;  Brüder lagert euch im Kreise op. 44; Heft 2: Zieht ihr Krieger, zieht von dannen op. 51; Zu Steffen sprach im Traume op. 62; Heft 3: Andante con Variatione o.op. (1798) für Pianoforte oder Clavichord. Verlag Dohr
 Deux Sonates pour Piano=Forte à quatre mains op. 50 F-Dur und op. 86 B-Dur („d’une difficulté progressive“). Verlag Dohr
 Six Menuets et Trios pour Pianoforte à quatre mains op. 13. Verlag Dohr
 Douze Menuets et Trios op. 79 (Klav. 4hd.) Verlag Dohr
 Trois Sonates à quatre mains op. 26. Verlag Dohr
 Trois Divertissements (d’une difficulté progressive) op. 36. (Klav. 4hd.) Verlag Dohr
 Trois Divertissements à quatre mains d’une difficulté progressive op. 41. Verlag Dohr
 Variationen op. 102: Fünf Variationen über die Cavatine „Nach soviel Leiden“ von Rossini op. 102,1; Fünf Variationen über das Volkslied „Es kann ja nicht immer so bleiben“ op. 102,2 (Klav. 4hd.). Verlag Dohr

Chamber music
 Klaviertrio Es-Dur o.op. (1803) für Violine, Violoncello und Klavier. Verlag Dohr
 Drei Klaviertrios op. 32 (1812) für Violine, Violoncello („ad libitum“) und Klavier. Verlag Dohr
 Drei Klaviertrios op. 34 (1834) für Violine, Violoncello („obligés“) und Klavier. Verlag Dohr
 Sonate G-Dur für Flöte und Klavier (nach dem „Flötenkonzert“ für Orgel aus op. 55, 5. Band Nr. 8), arrangiert von Oliver Drechsel. Verlag Dohr
 Sonate très facile für Violine und Klavier (Cembalo) Nr. 1 B-Dur. Verlag Dohr
 Sonate très facile für Violine und Klavier (Cembalo) Nr. 2 G-Dur. Verlag Dohr
 Drei Sestetti. (Erstdruck). Verlag Dohr

Organ works
 Kleine und leichte Orgelstücke, op. 1
 Zwölf kurze und leichte Orgelstücke, op. 2
 24 Trios op 20
 Douze Preludes pour l’orgue, op. 25
 Zwölf Orgelstücke, op. 29
 Concertstuck, op. 33
 40 Kleine, leichte und vermischte Orgelpräludien, op. 37
 12 fugirte Nachspiele für Orgel, op. 48
 Praktische Orgelschule, op. 55
 Variations on a Theme by Corelli, op. 56 
 12 Adagios for Organ, op.57
 Andante with Eight Variations, op.70 
 Drei Nachspiele für die Orgel, op. 78
 Neun Variationen und Finale, op. 90
 Der Choralfreund, op.110
 15 leichte fugierte Nachspiele, op. 114
 Exercise and 6 Grand Pieces, op.120
 Sammlung von Vor- und Nachspielen zum Gebrauche beim öffentlichen Gottesdienste, op. 129

Vocal works
 Sechs geistliche Lieder für Gesang und Orgel (oder Klavier) op. 81. Verlag Dohr
 Messe/Missa op. 91 (lateinischer und deutscher Text) für Chor, Soli (ad libitum) und Orgel. Edition Musica Rinata und Verlag Dohr
 Herr, ich bleibe stets an Dir. Psalm 73. Motette zu vier Singstimmen (Chor u. Soli) mit obligater Orgelbegleitung op. 127. Edition Musica Rinata und Verlag Dohr
 Gebet für Verstorbene op. 71. Motette zu vier Singstimmen (Chor u. Soli) und obligater Orgelbegleitung. Verlag Dohr
 Charfreytags-Kantate für Soli, Chor und Orgel op. 76. Verlag Dohr
 Befiehl dem Herrn deine Wege op. 85. Motette für Soli, Chor und Orgel. Edition Musica Rinata und Verlag Dohr
 Lobe den Herrn meine Seele. Motette zu vier Singstimmen (Chor u. Soli) und obligater Orgelbegleitung op. 88. Edition Musica Rinata und Verlag Dohr
 Gott sey uns gnädig und segne uns! Motette für Soli, Chor und Orgel op. 109. Verlag Dohr
 Halleluja von Pfeffel op. 63. Motette für Sopran, Alt, Tenor und Bass mit Begleitung des Pianoforte. Verlag Dohr
 Das Vater unser für Sopran, Alt, Tenor, Bass und obligate Orgel. Edition Musica Rinata und Verlag Dohr
 Weihnachtskantate op. 73. Edition Musica Rinata
 Gott sorgt für uns op. 98 Kantate für Chor und Orgel. Edition Musica Rinata
 Preis und Anbetung sei unserm Gott!

References

External links

Biographies 
 Biography from Naxos.com
 Another biography

Sound Files 
 MP3 of Praeludium in c minor
 MP3 of Flute Concerto

Music scores 
 
 

1770 births
1846 deaths
18th-century classical composers
18th-century German composers
18th-century keyboardists
18th-century German male musicians
19th-century classical composers
19th-century German composers
19th-century German male musicians
19th-century organists
German classical organists
German Classical-period composers
German male classical composers
German Romantic composers
German male organists
Male classical organists